Adolph Deutsch (20 October 1897 – 1 January 1980) was a British-American composer, conductor and arranger.

Born Adolph Sender Charles Deutsch in London, England, he emigrated to the United States in 1911, and settled in Buffalo, New York. His parents, Alex (Alexander) Deutsch and Dena née Gerst, were German Jews.

In 1914, Deutsch was "a Buffalo movie house musician", accompanying silent films. Deutsch began his composing career on Broadway in the 1920s and 1930s, before working for Hollywood films beginning in the late 1930s. For Broadway, he orchestrated Irving Berlin's As Thousands Cheer and George and Ira Gershwin's Pardon My English.

Deutsch won Oscars for his background music for Oklahoma! (1955), and for conducting the music for Seven Brides for Seven Brothers (1954) and Annie Get Your Gun (1950). He was nominated for The Band Wagon (1953) and the 1951 film version of Show Boat, for which he conducted the orchestra. For Broadway and Hollywood, he conducted, composed and arranged music, but did not write songs, not even for the Broadway shows on which he worked. In addition to his music for westerns and his conducting of the scores for musicals, Deutsch composed for films noir, including The Mask of Dimitrios (1944), The Maltese Falcon (1941), and Nobody Lives Forever (1946), as well as Little Women (the 1949 adaptation), and the Billy Wilder comedies Some Like It Hot (1959), and The Apartment (1960). His final film was Go Naked in the World.

Deutsch died of heart failure on 1 January 1980.

Filmography

1937 They Won't Forget     
1937 The Great Garrick
1938 Swing Your Lady
1938 Racket Busters
1938 Valley of the Giants
1938 Heart of the North
1939 Off the Record
1939 The Kid from Kokomo
1939 Indianapolis Speedway
1939 The Angels Wash Their Faces
1939 Espionage Agent
1940 The Fighting 69th
1940 Castle on the Hudson
1940 Three Cheers for the Irish
1940 Saturday's Children
1940 Torrid Zone
1940 They Drive by Night
1940 Flowing Gold
1940 Tugboat Annie Sails Again
1940 East of the River
1941 All Through the Night
1941 The Maltese Falcon
1941 Manpower
1941 Kisses for Breakfast
1941 Underground
1941 Singapore Woman
1941 The Great Mr. Nobody
1941 High Sierra
1942 Lucky Jordan
1942 George Washington Slept Here
1942 You Can't Escape Forever
1942 Across the Pacific
1942 The Big Shot
1942 Juke Girl
1942 Larceny, Inc.
1943 Northern Pursuit
1943 Action in the North Atlantic
1944 The Doughgirls
1944 The Mask of Dimitrios
1944 Uncertain Glory
1945 Danger Signal
1945 Escape in the Desert
1946 Nobody Lives Forever
1946 Shadow of a Woman
1946 Three Strangers
1947 Blaze of Noon
1947 Ramrod
1948 Whispering Smith
1948 Julia Misbehaves
1949 Intruder in the Dust
1949 The Stratton Story (uncredited)
1949 Little Women 
1950 Pagan Love Song (uncredited)
1950 Mrs. O'Malley and Mr. Malone
1950 Father of the Bride
1950 The Big Hangover
1950 Stars in My Crown
1951 Show Boat (uncredited)
1951 Soldiers Three
1952 Million Dollar Mermaid (uncredited)
1953 The Band Wagon (uncredited)
1953 Torch Song
1953 The Long, Long Trailer
1954 Seven Brides for Seven Brothers (uncredited)
1955 Interrupted Melody (uncredited)
1956 Tea and Sympathy
1956 The Rack
1958 The Matchmaker
1959 Some Like It Hot (background score)
1960 The Apartment
1961 Go Naked in the World

References

External links

Adolph Deutsch - New Songs, Playlists & Latest News - BBC Music at the BBC

1897 births
1980 deaths
Best Original Music Score Academy Award winners
English conductors (music)
British male conductors (music)
English film score composers
English male film score composers
Jewish composers
English people of German-Jewish descent
Musicians from London
Musicians from Buffalo, New York
People from Palm Desert, California
20th-century British conductors (music)
20th-century English composers
20th-century American male musicians
British emigrants to the United States